Lagenantha is a genus of flowering plants belonging to the family Amaranthaceae.

Its native range is Somalia to Kenya, Socotra.

Species:

Lagenantha cycloptera 
Lagenantha gillettii

References

Amaranthaceae
Amaranthaceae genera